This article is about the demographic features of the population of Morocco, including population density, ethnicity, education level, health of the populace, economic status, religious affiliations and other aspects of the population. The population of Morocco in 2021 is 37.271 million.

Moroccans are primarily of Arab and Berber origin. Socially, there are two contrasting groups of Moroccans: those living in the cities and those in the rural areas. Among the rural, several classes have formed such as landowners, peasants, and tenant farmers. Moroccans live mainly in the north and west portions of Morocco. However, they prefer living in the more fertile regions near the Mediterranean Sea.

Between the Nile and the Red Sea were living Arab tribes expelled from Arabia for their turbulence, Banu Hilal and Banu Sulaym, who often plundered farming areas in the Nile Valley. According to Ibn Khaldun, whole tribes set off with women, children, ancestors, animals and camping equipment. These tribes, along with others, who mass arrived in the region of Morocco in colossal numbers around the 12th-13th centuries, and later the Ma'qil in the 14th century, contributed to a more extensive ethnic, cultural, and linguistic Arabization of Morocco over time, especially beyond the major urban centres and the northern regions well into the countryside. The descendants of the original Arab settlers who continue to speak Arabic as a first language currently form the single largest population group in North Africa.

About 99% of Moroccans are considered to be Sunni Muslims religiously or culturally. The numbers of the Jewish minority has decreased significantly since the creation of the State of Israel in 1948. Today there are 2,500 Moroccan Jews inside the country. Thousands of Moroccan Jews living in Europe, Israel and North America visit the country regularly. There is a small but apparently growing minority of Moroccan Christians made of local Moroccan converts (not Europeans). In 2014, most of the 86,206 foreign residents are French people, Spaniards, Algerians and sub-Saharan African students.

Population 

Source: Haut-Commissariat au Plan (HCP)

Fertility rate (The Demographic Health Survey) 
Figures from The Demographic Health Survey

Fertility Rate (TFR) (Wanted Fertility Rate) and CBR (Crude Birth Rate):

Life expectancy

Source: UN World Population Prospects

Structure of the population 

Structure of the population (Census 2004):

According to 2004 census

Structure of the population (01.07.2013) (Estimates based on the results of the 2004 Population Census) :

Structure of the population (Census 2014) :

According to 2014 census

Population Estimates by Sex and Age Group (Estimates 1.VII.2020):

Ethnic groups 
Moroccans are primarily of Arab and Berber origin as in other neighbouring countries in the Maghreb. Arabs make up 44% of the population of Morocco, Arabized Berbers make up 24%, Berbers make up 21%, the Baydhan make up 10%, and others make up 1%. 

The Arab population of Morocco is a result of the inflow of nomadic Arab tribes from the Arabian Peninsula since the Muslim conquest of the Maghreb in the 7th century with a major wave in the 11th century. The major migration to the region by Arab tribes was in the 11th century when the tribes of Banu Hilal and Banu Sulaym, along with others, were sent by the Fatimids to defeat a Berber rebellion and then settle in the Maghreb. Between the Nile and the Red Sea were Arab tribes expelled from Arabia for their turbulence, Banu Hilal and Banu Sulaym, who often plundered farming areas in the Nile Valley. According to Ibn Khaldun, whole tribes set off with women, children, ancestors, animals and camping equipment. These tribes, who arrived in the region of Morocco around the 12th-13th centuries, and later the Ma'qil in the 14th century, contributed to a more extensive ethnic, genetic, cultural, and linguistic Arabization of Morocco over time, especially beyond the major urban centres and the northern regions which were the main sites of Arabization up to that point.

The Berber population mainly lives in the mountainous regions of Morocco where some preserve Berber culture, and are split into three groups; Rifians, Shilha, and Zayanes. The Rifians inhabit the Rif mountains, the Shilha inhabit the Anti-Atlas mountains, and the Zayanes inhabit the Middle Atlas mountains. The Arabized Berbers who constitute about a quarter of the population are the Berbers who were Arabized mainly as a result of the Arab nomad inflow, and have adopted Arab culture and the Arabic language as their native language, especially those who sought the protection of the Bedouin. Some parts of the population are descendants of refugees who fled Spain after the Reconquista in the 15th century. The Trans-Saharan slave trade brought a population of Sub-Saharan Africans to Morocco. After the founding of Israel and start of the Arab-Israeli conflict in 1948, many Jews felt compelled to leave Morocco especially after the anti-Jewish riots in Oujda, and many fled to Israel, Europe, and North America, and by 1967 250,000 Jews left Morocco. In a 2021 survey on 1,200 Moroccan adults, 68% were Arab, 25.6% were Berber, 3.6% were Sahrawi, and 2.7% were others.

Languages

Arabic and Berber are the official languages of Morocco. The majority spoken language in Morocco is Arabic which is spoken by 92% of the population and includes the dialects of Moroccan Arabic (Hilalian dialects) and Hassaniya Arabic. Berber languages are spoken by 26% of the population in three varieties (Tarifit, Shilha, and Tamazight).

French is an implicitly "official language" of government and big business, and is taught throughout school and still serves as Morocco's primary language of business, economics, and scientific university education. French is also widely used in the media. Morocco is a member of La Francophonie. Berber activists have struggled since the 1960s for the recognition of their language as an official language of Morocco, which was achieved in July 2011 following the February 20th 2011 uprising. About 20,000 Moroccans in the northern part of the country speak some Spanish.

English, while still far behind French in terms of the number of proficient speakers, is rapidly becoming a foreign language of choice among educated youth and business people. It has been taught to Moroccan students after the fourth year of elementary school since the education reforms of 2002.

Main populated areas
Most Moroccans live west and north of the Atlas Mountains, a range that insulates the country from the Sahara Desert. Casablanca is the largest city and the centre of business and industry, and has the leading seaport and airport. Rabat is the seat of government. Tangier and Nador are the two major northern seaports on the Mediterranean. Fez is a cultural, religious and industrial centre. Marrakesh and Agadir are the two major tourist centres. Oujda is the largest city of eastern Morocco. Meknes houses the military academy. Kenitra has the largest military airbase. Mohammedia has the largest oil refineries and other major industrial installations.

Education
Education in Morocco is free and compulsory through primary school (age 15). Nevertheless, many children—particularly girls in rural areas—still do not attend school. The country's illiteracy rate is usually around 50 percent for most of the country, but reaches as high as 90 percent among girls in rural regions. In July 2006, Prime minister Driss Jettou announced that illiteracy rate has declined by 39 percent, while two million people had attended literacy courses during the past four years.

Morocco has about 660,000 students enrolled in 14 public universities. One of the oldest and among the most prestigious is Mohammed V in Rabat, with faculties of law, sciences, liberal arts, and medicine. University of Karueein, in Fez, has been a centre for Islamic studies for more than 1,000 years. Al Akhawayn University in Ifrane, founded in 1993 by King Hassan II and King Fahd of Saudi Arabia, is an English-medium, American-style university comprising about 1,700 students.

Other demographic statistics 
Demographic statistics according to the World Population Review in 2022.

One birth every 48 seconds	
One death every 3 minutes	
One net migrant every 12 minutes	
Net gain of one person every 1 minutes

The following demographics are from the CIA World Factbook unless otherwise indicated.

Population
36,738,229 (2022 est.)
note: includes Western Sahara

33 million (2014)

Religions

Muslim 99% (official; virtually all Sunni, <0.1% Shia), other 1% (includes Christian, Jewish, and Baha'i); note - Jewish about 3,000-3,500 (2020 est.)

note: does not include data from the former Western Sahara

Age structure

0-14 years: 27.04% (male 4,905,626/female 4,709,333)
15-24 years: 16.55% (male 2,953,523/female 2,930,708)
25-54 years: 40.64% (male 7,126,781/female 7,325,709)
55-64 years: 8.67% (male 1,533,771/female 1,548,315)
65 years and over: 7.11% (male 1,225,307/female 1,302,581) (2020 est.)
note: does not include data from the former Western Sahara

0–14 years: 27.8% (male 4,514,623/female 4,382,487)
15–64 years: 66.1% (male 10,335,931/female 10,785,380)
65 years and over: 6.1% (male 881,622/female 1,068,318) (2011 est.)

Median age
total: 29.1 years. Country comparison to the world: 137th
male: 28.7 years
female: 29.6 years (2020 est.)
note: does not include data from the former Western Sahara

total: 26.9 years
male: 26.3 years
female: 27.4 years (2011 est.)

Population growth rate
0.91% (2022 est.) Country comparison to the world: 107th
note: does not include data from the former Western Sahara

1.054% (2012 est.)

Total fertility rate
2.29 children born/woman (2022 est.) Country comparison to the world: 79th
note: does not include data from the former Western Sahara

2.50 children born/woman (2004)
2.59 children born/woman (2011)

Birth rate
17.42 births/1,000 population (2022 est.) Country comparison to the world: 89th
note: does not include data from the former Western Sahara

18.97 births/1,000 population (2012 est.)

Death rate
6.6 deaths/1,000 population (2022 est.) Country comparison to the world: 132nd
note: does not include data from the former Western Sahara

4.76 deaths/1,000 population (July 2012 est.)

Net migration rate
-1.74 migrant(s)/1,000 population (2022 est.) Country comparison to the world: 165th
note: does not include data from the former Western Sahara

-3.67 migrant(s)/1,000 population (2012 est.)

Contraceptive prevalence rate
70.8% (2018)
note: does not include data from the former Western Sahara

Urbanization
urban population: 64.6% of total population (2022)
rate of urbanization: 1.88% annual rate of change (2020–25 est.)
note:  data does not include former Western Sahara

urban population: 58% of total population (2010)
rate of urbanization: 2.1% annual rate of change (2010–15 est.)

Sex ratio
at birth: 1.05 male(s)/female
under 15 years: 1.03 male(s)/female
15–64 years: 0.96 male(s)/female
65 years and over: 0.82 male(s)/female
total population: 0.97 male(s)/female (2012 est.)

Infant mortality rate
total: 26.49 deaths/1,000 live births
male: 31.16 deaths/1,000 live births
female: 21.59 deaths/1,000 live births (2012 est.)

Life expectancy at birth
total population: 73.68 years Country comparison to the world: 145th
male: 71.98 years
female: 75.46 years (2022 est.)
note: does not include data from the former Western Sahara

total population: 76.11 years
male: 73.04 years
female: 79.32 years (2012 est.)

Ethnic groups
Arabs (44%)
Arabized Berbers (24%)
Berbers (21%)
Baydhan (10%)
Others (1%)

Languages 

 Arabic (official)
Berber (official)
French
Spanish

Literacy
Definition: age 10 and over can read and write
total population: 73.8%
male: 83.3%
female: 64.6% (2018)
note: does not include data from the former Western Sahara

Total population: 73.55% (2012)
 :Category:Education in Morocco

School life expectancy (primary to tertiary education)
total: 14 years
male: 14 years
female: 14 years (2020)

note: does not include data from the former Western Sahara

Major infectious diseases
note: clusters of cases of a respiratory illness caused by the novel coronavirus (COVID-19) are occurring in Morocco; as of 6 October 2021, Morocco has reported a total of 936,236 cases of COVID-19 or 2,536.5 cumulative cases of COVID-19 per 100,000 population with 38.94 cumulative deaths per 100,000 population; as of 2 October 2021, 60.91% of the population has received at least one dose of COVID-19 vaccine

Unemployment, youth ages 15–24
total: 22.2%
male: 22%
female: 22.8% (2016 est.)
note: does not include data from the former Western Sahara

References

External links 

  Results of the 2004 census
  Results of the 2014 census
  Results of the 2004 census by Douars

Demographics of Morocco